The United States ambassador to the United Nations is the leader of the U.S. delegation, the U.S. Mission to the United Nations. The position is formally known as the permanent representative of the United States of America to the United Nations, with the rank and status of ambassador extraordinary and plenipotentiary, and representative of the United States of America in the United Nations Security Council.

The deputy ambassador assumes the duties of the ambassador in his or her absence. As with all United States ambassadors, the ambassador to the UN and the deputy ambassador are nominated by the president of the United States and confirmed by the Senate. The ambassador serves at the pleasure of the President.

The U.S. permanent representative is charged with representing the United States on the UN Security Council, and during all plenary meetings of the General Assembly, except when a more senior officer of the United States (such as the secretary of state or the president of the United States) is in attendance.

The current ambassador is Linda Thomas-Greenfield, who was nominated by President Joe Biden and confirmed by the Senate on February 23, 2021.

Cabinet status 
Henry Cabot Lodge Jr., a leading moderate Republican who lost his seat in the United States Senate to John F. Kennedy in the 1952 elections, was appointed ambassador to the United Nations in 1953 by Dwight D. Eisenhower in gratitude for the defeated senator's role in the new president's defeat of conservative leader Robert A. Taft for the 1952 Republican nomination and subsequent service as his campaign manager in the general election; Eisenhower raised the ambassadorship to Cabinet rank in order to give Lodge direct access to him without having to go through the State Department.

The ambassadorship continued to hold this status through the Reagan administration but was removed from Cabinet rank by George H. W. Bush, who had previously held the position himself. It was restored under the Clinton administration. It was not a Cabinet-level position under the George W. Bush administration (from 2001 to 2009), but was once again elevated under the Obama administration, and initially retained as such by the Trump administration. However, in December 2018, it was reported by several news organizations that the Trump administration would once again downgrade the position to non-Cabinet rank. The position was again elevated to Cabinet rank in the Biden administration.

Former UN ambassador and national security advisor John R. Bolton has publicly opposed the granting of Cabinet-level status to the office, stating "One, it overstates the role and importance the U.N. should have in U.S. foreign policy, second, you shouldn't have two secretaries in the same department".

List of ambassadors 
Status

The following is a chronological list of those who have held the office:

List of deputy ambassadors

The United States deputy ambassador to the United Nations serves as the second most senior American diplomat before the United Nations General Assembly and the Security Council in New York and carries the diplomatic rank of ambassador extraordinary and plenipotentiary. In the absence of the ambassador, the deputy serves in his or her place.

 Ernest A. Gross - October 11, 1949 – 1953
 James J. Wadsworth† February 28, 1953 – 1960
 Charles W. Yost† - February 13, 1961 – 1966
 William B. Buffum - January 1967 – 1970
 W. Tapley Bennett Jr. - 1971–1977
 James F. Leonard - 1977–1979
 William vanden Heuvel - 1979–1981
 Kenneth L. Adelman - confirmed July 29, 1981 – 1983
 José S. Sorzano - confirmed July 26, 1983 – 1985
 Herbert S. Okun - confirmed October 1, 1985 (following a recess appointment) – 1989
 Alexander F. Watson - confirmed August 4, 1989 – 1992
 Edward S. Walker Jr. - confirmed October 8, 1992 – 1993
 Skip Gnehm - April 1994 – August 1997
 Peter Burleigh - August 1997 – December 1999
 James B. Cunningham - December 12, 1999 – July 2004
 Anne W. Patterson - August 2004 – August 2005
 Alejandro Daniel Wolff - November 2005 – June 2010
 Rosemary DiCarlo - July 8, 2010 – c. November 1, 2014
 Michele J. Sison - December 7, 2014 – February 21, 2018
 Kelley Eckels Currie (acting) - February 21, 2018 – June 8, 2018
 Jonathan Cohen - June 8, 2018 – November 17, 2019
 Taryn Frideres - October 2019 - February 25, 2021
 Richard M. Mills Jr. - November 9, 2020 – present
 Jeffrey Prescott - February 25, 2021 – present

†These deputy ambassadors later served as full U.S. ambassador to the United Nations position (see above).

See also 
Diplomatic Security Service
Residence of the United States Ambassador to the United Nations

Notes

References

External links

 
United Nations
United States
United States and the United Nations
United States diplomacy